Saleh Khana is a large village in the Nowshera District of the  Khyber Pakhtunkhwa Province located just below the Cherat mountains, The people of this village are Pashtuns of the Khattak tribe.

Like other parts of Pakistan, many people live overseas for work, the people of this village are spread throughout the world, with 60% living abroad. Among the countries where one can find residents of this village are, to name a few, the UK, USA, UAE,  Canada, Australia, and Malaysia. The majority can be found in the UK, mainly in Birmingham, Manchester, and Aylesbury. This has earned the village the name of "little England" due to most of its residents having dual citizenship in the UK. Originally, the residents moved aboard during the early 1960s to earn and send income back home. However, as time passed, many decided to stay abroad settling with dual citizenship and regularly travelling back and forth occasionally.

The village is surrounded by the Cherat mountains range. Within the mountains range, just above the village, is a former British Hill station or cantonment that was used in 1861 and is currently being occupied by the Pakistani army. It mainly consists of a training ground for the Pakistani SSG. It is off limits to the public and hosts the world's largest zipline in South Asia  which covers ranges of 1.6 km located at the Khattak mountain ranges.

It is the only village in Pakistan with multiple banks.

The name Saleh Khana derives from Arabic and means "Good Home" & it's well known for its famous slogan, "The Few, the Proud".

People & History

The people of this village are primarily Pashtuns, a tribal ethnic group located in both Northern Pakistan & Afghanistan. They are of the Khattak tribe which are known for their bravery and strict adherence to Pashtun customs which promote Honour, Pride, Bravery, Protection of Women, Revenge, and Hospitality called the Pashtunwali. The Pashtunwali is followed by all Pashtuns from Afghanistan to Pakistan as a social code of conduct and how they carry themselves. As well as this, the people are Muslims.

In 1984, there was a huge tribal fight, between the tribes of Saleh Khana and the neighbouring village of Kotli Kalan which eventually was solved when both the villages were split up and divided into two.

Pashtuns of this village have migrated from their homeland in the Tirah valley in present day Khyber Pakhtunkhwa, to their current village during the mid 17th century.

After brutal tribal wars in the 17th century the Oriya Khel tribe migrated east and settled in Jalozai in Khattak tribe territories. Great hostility from surrounding clans lead to a major blood feud between the Oriya Khel and Khattak clans.

The feud was so big that a Loy Jirga (Pashtun grand council) took place in order to end the bloodshed; as a result of this jirga to end the tribal feuds, the Oriya Khel were given the current lands that they now reside in today, hence they moved up into and inhabited the mountainous region of Cherat.
     
Today 60% of the inhabitants of Saleh Khana have migrated to developed countries around the world, primarily to Europe, United States of America, Canada and the United Kingdom in the Birmingham and Ayelsbury regions; during the 19th and 20th century in order to seek work and send money back home to the village.

However, as time has gone by a lot of families have decided to stay and reside in the UK, US, and European countries and now view themselves with a dual identity. However, Pashto and Pashtunwali always takes precedence over all other identities.

Language

The language predominantly spoken here is the Khattak dialect of Pashto, which is the Central dialect of Pashto. The similar dialect is understood and spoken by all Central Pashtun tribes such as the Afridi, Wazir, Meshud. Orakzai, Bannusi Dawar, Bangash, Turi as well as Central Pashtun tribes across the border in Afghanistan including Zadran, Zazai, and Mangal.

Central Pashto has a different vocabulary and sound than Northern Pashto dialect, which is spoken in Peshawar, Mardan, and Swat, mainly by the Yusufzai tribe. For example, in the Central Pashto dialect it is "Mozja or Mizha" for "we" whereas in Northern Pashto, it is "Monga" for "we".

Slight differences occur however since Saleh Khana is relatively close to Peshawar, a lot of the inhabitants can understand the Northern Dialects which is considered standard Pashto used in books, letters, also called "Kitaabi Pashto." Therefore, the Pashto spoken in Saleh Khana  is unique on its own terms.

Tribes and Clans
Saleh Khana is inhabited by the Khattak tribe of the Pashtuns. The tribe is then divided into clans (khels). These are:

Qurban Khel
Durran Khel
Gurnh khel 
Mund Khel
Mes Khel
Amirjan Khel
Amin Khel

Each clan has its own Mullah (Leader) which is their clan's representative in a Pashtun council called the jirga, to settle village disputes and promote progress. The Gunh Khel clan is made up of the Maliks (the Chiefs) of Saleh Khana and thus all village decisions are made through them. Some of the notable Malaks were: Malak Bahadar, Malak Kajeer, Malak Sher Zada, and Malak Akbar Zada.

Every clan has its own Mohallah and every Mohalla has its own Masjid and own representatives for a tribal/clan meeting which is called a Jirga in Pashto.

References

Populated places in Nowshera District